was a Japanese motorcycle racer and racing driver.

Sunako was a works rider for Yamaha during the late 1950s and early 1960s. After racing in Japanese events, Sunako made his Grand Prix motorcycle racing debut in the 1961 Belgian Grand Prix, where he finished sixth in the 250cc category. He made two starts in the 1963 Grand Prix motorcycle racing season, scoring his only podium at the Belgian Grand Prix. He finished the year seventh in the championship standings.

After the 1963 season, Sunako made the switch to four-wheel racing and signed with the Prince Motor Company as a works driver. He made his debut in the 1964 Japanese Grand Prix at Suzuka Circuit. He drove his Prince Skyline S54 to a second-place finish in the GT-II sports car race, behind the Porsche 904 of Sokichi Shikiba. This race is cited as the "Beginning of the Skyline Legend" in motor racing.

In 1966, Sunako won the Japanese Grand Prix sports car race at Fuji Speedway in his Prince R380. After Nissan's acquisition of Prince was completed later in the year, Sunako continued as a works driver for Nissan. He finished the year as the champion of the All-Japan Racing Driver Championship in the touring car division.

He was the co-driver to Motoharu Kurosawa when he won the 1969 Japanese Grand Prix in a Nissan R382. Sunako did not drive during the 120 lap race, but is officially credited as a winning driver alongside Kurosawa.

Sunako retired from racing in 1971, and continued to serve as an ambassador for Nissan until he died on 3 January 2020.

His son, Tomohiko Sunako, is also a racing driver.

Racing Record

Motorcycle Grand Prix results 
(key) (Races in bold indicate pole position)

References 

1932 births
2020 deaths
250cc World Championship riders
Japanese motorcycle racers
Japanese racing drivers
Sportspeople from Kaohsiung
Nismo drivers